James Alexander Campbell may refer to:

 James Alexander Campbell (politician) (1825–1908), Scottish MP and privy councillor
 James A. Campbell (Medal of Honor) (1844–1904), American Civil War soldier
 James Campbell (rugby union) (1858–1902), Scottish rugby player

See also
James Campbell (disambiguation)